Monte Is Caravius is the highest massif in the Sulcis Mountains, in southern Sardinia, Italy. The information on the height of the relief is controversial: geographical atlases, historical bibliographic sources and official documentation attribute the height of 1116 m; other sources, including several of an administrative or technical-scientific nature that use information from territorial information systems, indicate a height of 1113 m.

References

Is Caravius